Grand-Popo is a town, arrondissement, and commune in the Mono Department of south-western Benin. The commune covers an area of 289 square kilometres and as at the 2013 Census had a population of 57,636 people.

The term "Grand-Popo" is a European exonym for the ancient town and kingdom of "Hulagan" (Great Hula).  The  Hula/Xwla/Phla people that once dominated the Togo-Benin coast traditionally regarded Great Hula as their ancestral town of common origin.   It is unclear why Europeans began calling it Popo rather than Hula. It may come from a generic Yoruba term "popo" for peoples to their "west", which was subsequently borrowed by the Portuguese to refer to the Hula/Phla specifically.  An alternative theory connects the "Popo" term to an ancient ruler called Kpokpo of Tado (an Aja town in the interior), which the Europeans may have confused with Hulagan. 

The town grew around the slave trade, but coastal erosion has now destroyed most of the old town. The town is now a centre for voodoo and home to a Finnish-African cultural centre, Villa Karo. The town's main industry is fishing.

The town inspired the name of the French electronic music duo Grand Popo Football Club, as well as the name of the iPad application creator Grand Popo LLC.

History

References

External links

Communes of Benin
Arrondissements of Benin
Populated places in the Mono Department